Kulturhavn Kronborg  is an area in the harbour of Helsingør dedicated to culture and events, designed to attract residents and visitors. It  is a joint initiative by Kronborg Castle, the Danish Maritime Museum, Kulturværftet (The Culture Yard) and Helsingør harbour, and was opened in May 2013.

Kulturhavn Kronborg is the culmination of an ambitious project by the city of Helsingør to leave the industrial era behind and enter a new chapter for the town. This was achieved first, with the establishment of the Kulturværftet in 2010, in the buildings of the former Helsingør Værft (Elsinore Shipyard), and subsequently, with the opening of the Danish Maritime Museum in the summer of 2013, in the neighbouring dry dock.

The main attraction to Kulturhavn Kronborg is the Kronborg Castle, a UNESCO World Heritage Site. In the centre harbour basin the Town of Helsingør has commissioned a statue by the artist duo, Elmgreen and Dragset, with the title, han, installed in 2012.

References

External links
 Official website 
 The Culture Yard 
 Kronborg Castle in Elsinore 
 Danish Maritime Museum 
 The port of Elsinore 
 Helsingør Tourist Bureau website 
 Port of Helsingør 
 Helsingør municipality's official website 

Danish culture
2013 establishments in Denmark
Helsingør
Ports and harbours of Denmark
Modernist architecture in Helsingør
Bjarke Ingels buildings
World Heritage Sites in Denmark
Museums in the Capital Region of Denmark
Tourist attractions in the Capital Region of Denmark